Leopold Wharton (September 1, 1870 – September 27, 1927) was an American film director, producer and writer.  He directed 37 films between 1911 and 1922, including the 1915 film The New Adventures of J. Rufus Wallingford, which featured Oliver Hardy. In 1920, Wharton joined The Lambs Club.

He was the brother of Theodore Wharton, who was also a film director. He was born in Manchester, England, and died in New York City.

Selected filmography
 The Exploits of Elaine (1914)
 The New Adventures of J. Rufus Wallingford (1915)
 The New Exploits of Elaine (1915)
 The Romance of Elaine (1915)
 The Lottery Man (1916)
 Patria (1917)
 The Great White Trail (1917)
 The Eagle's Eye (1918)
 Mr. Potter of Texas (1922)

References

External links

1870 births
1927 deaths
American film directors
American film producers
American male screenwriters
Mass media people from Manchester
British emigrants to the United States
20th-century American male writers
20th-century American screenwriters